Fuquay-Varina Woman's Club Clubhouse is a historic Woman's Club clubhouse located at Fuquay-Varina, Wake County, North Carolina.  It was built in 1937, and is a one-story, "T"-shaped, Bungalow / American Craftsman influenced frame building.  The building consists of a rectangular meeting room measuring 24 feet by 40 feet, and a 14 feet by 24 feet rear ell containing the kitchen, a small pantry and a bathroom.

It was listed on the National Register of Historic Places in 2007.

References

External links
Fuquay-Varina Woman's Club

Women's club buildings
Clubhouses on the National Register of Historic Places in North Carolina
Buildings and structures completed in 1937
Buildings and structures in Wake County, North Carolina
National Register of Historic Places in Wake County, North Carolina
1937 establishments in North Carolina
Women in North Carolina